Army Canal ( in Arabic) is a  waterway connecting the Tigris and Diyala rivers, forms the western boundary of Sadr City, and when completed, will once again supply irrigation water to nearby agricultural areas and clean drinking water to Rusafa, Baghdad. Also along its course a highway road runs. The Army Canal, which runs a total of 25 kilometers spanning from Adhamiyah (Saba Abkar) in northeastern Baghdad to Rustimiyah in southeastern Baghdad, was built by October 10, 1960, and inaugurated in July 15, 1961, by Abd al-Kareem Qassim, the former president of Iraq. It later became a ribbon of stagnant water and because of sludge, low water levels and lack of maintenance.

References

External links
 Major Iraqi-led project begins with Army Canal

Buildings and structures in Baghdad
Canals in Iraq
Canals opened in 1960